The Renard R.31 was a Belgian reconnaissance aircraft of the 1930s. A single-engined parasol monoplane, 32 R.31s were built for the Belgian Air Force, the survivors of which, although obsolete, remained in service when Nazi Germany invaded Belgium in 1940. The Renard R.31 was the only World War II operational military aircraft entirely designed and built in Belgium.

Design and development

The Renard R.31 was designed by Alfred Renard of Constructions Aéronautiques G. Renard to meet a requirement of the Belgian Air Force for a short ranged reconnaissance and army co-operation aircraft. It first flew from Evere Airfield, near Brussels, on 16 October 1932.

It was a parasol monoplane of mixed construction, powered by a Rolls-Royce Kestrel engine, with a welded steel tubing structure with metal sheet covering the forward fuselage and fabric covering of the remainder of the airframe. The wing was held in position by a single Vee strut on each side, conjoined with its fixed under carriage.

An order for 28 R.31s was placed in March 1934, with six to be built by Renard and the remainder by SABCA. One aircraft was fitted with a Lorraine Petrel engine for evaluation, but this was later replaced by the normal Kestrel engine. A second aircraft was fitted with an enclosed canopy and a Gnome-Rhône Mistral Major radial engine, becoming the R-32, with this then being replaced by a Hispano-Suiza 12Y engine, but the R-32 did not show sufficiently improved performance to gain a production order. A further six R.31s were ordered in August 1935.

Operational history
The R.31 entered service with the Belgian Air Force in 1935, replacing the Breguet 19 in the 9e and 11e Escadrilles d'Observation based at Liège. In service, it was not popular, as it had poor handling, being vulnerable to entering flat spins if mishandled, with all aerobatics therefore being banned.

The R.31 was hopelessly obsolete, and those that were not destroyed on the ground in the early hours of the German Blitzkrieg invasion of Belgium in May 1940 were ravaged by German fighters as they bravely attempted to gather information on the German invasion. None apparently functioned as ground support aircraft during the brief Belgian Army resistance, instead flying fifty-four reconnaissance sorties in support of the Allied forces defending Belgium. Their  last sortie, flown on the afternoon of 27 May 1940, was also the final mission flown by the Belgian Air Force in its attempt to repel the Germans. Following the German occupation of Belgium, the Luftwaffe had no interest in the machines and those that had survived the initial onslaught were unused or were destroyed. Overall, these machines had no significant impact on the war although they were briefly involved.

Operators

Belgian Air Force

Specifications (Renard R.31)

See also

References

Further reading

 Pacco, John. "Renard R.31" Belgisch Leger/Armee Belge: Het militair Vliegwezen/l'Aeronautique militaire 1930-1940. Aartselaar, Belgium, 2003, pp. 49–51. .
 Delannay, Alain de la Lindi, André Henry. "La Saga du R-31" . Brussels, Belgium:Fonds National Alfred Renard www.fnar.be, 2003, pp. 378.

External links

A Belgian Historical Aviation Archive

1930s Belgian military reconnaissance aircraft
R.31
Single-engined tractor aircraft
Aircraft first flown in 1932